Arriscope may refer to:
Arriscope (lens), a line of anamorphic lenses for Arriflex
Arriscope (Surgical Microscope), a fully digital surgical microscope developed by Arri